This is a list of the individuals who were, at any given time, considered the next in line to succeed the Burmese monarch to inherit the throne of various Burmese kingdoms (849–1885). Those who actually succeeded at any future time are shown in bold.

Pagan Kingdom

Pinya Kingdom

Sagaing Kingdom

Ava Kingdom

Ramanya

Prome Kingdom

Toungoo Dynasty
The dates after 1582 are according to the Gregorian calendar.

Konbaung Dynasty

Thibaw Min was deposed and exiled in 1885. He died in exile in India in 1916. He was succeeded as head of the family by his daughter Myat Phaya  (1925–1956). From 1956 to 2019, the claimant to the throne was Taw Phaya, the second son of Princess Myat Phaya Galay.

References

Bibliography
 
 
 
 
 
 
 
 
 
 

Burmese monarchs
Lists of Burmese monarchs
Heirs to the Burmese throne